Women of Hope: African Americans Who Made A Difference is a 1998 non-fiction children's book by American author Joyce Hansen, published by Scholastic.

Description 
The book features one-page profiles of 13 African American women written by Hansen, alongside black-and-white photographic portraits of each woman. The portraits were part of a poster series created by Bread and Roses, a cultural project of 1199 National Health and Human Services Employees Union. Bread and Roses executive director Moe Foner wrote the foreword to the book.

The women profiled are:

 Maya Angelou, writer
 Alexa Canady, neurosurgeon
 Septima Poinsette Clark, educator
 Ella J. Baker, activist
 Ruby Dee, actress
 The Delany sisters (Sarah Louise Delany and Annie Elizabeth Delany), civil rights pioneers
 Marian Wright Edelman, activist
 Mae Jemison, astronaut
 Fannie Lou Hamer, activist
 Toni Morrison, writer
 Alice Walker, writer
 Ida B. Wells, journalist

Reception 
Publishers Weekly wrote that the book's chronological organization "creates a sense of the expanding horizon of opportunities that African-American women have gained as the century has progressed," adding that the "handsome volume will likely engender in readers an appreciation for life's countless possibilities, and send them scrambling to find out more about these extraordinary women." In a review for Book Page, Lisa Horak wrote that the book's "brief profiles are perfect for a book report or for young readers with short attention spans". Kirkus Reviews wrote that the book is "inspirational, but it’s also effective as art and as history."

References 

1998 children's books
Scholastic Corporation books
American children's books
American non-fiction books
Children's non-fiction books
African-American women